David Serero is a multi award winning French architect who has had many international projects in France, United States and Italy.

Biography 
Serero was born in 1974 in Grenoble. He graduated with a Master in Architecture and Urban planning from Columbia University (New York) and with an Architecture Degree from Ecole d’architecture Paris-Villemin. He lives and works in Paris and in New York.

In 2002, he was listed by the Surface magazine as one of the top ten Avant Garde Designers. He also received in 2002 the “Nouveaux albums des jeunes architectes français” award by the French Ministry for Culture and, the same year, the New York Young Architects award, by the architectural league of New York. In 2004, David Serero received the prestigious Rome Prize by the French Academy in Rome (Villa Medicis).

His work is characterized by a personal and innovative approach of architectural form and building envelope geometries. The wide use of organic forms, inspired from his studies of natural processes evokes the work of the American architect Frank Lloyd Wright or the aesthetic of Japanese architect Toyo Ito. His project of the new auditorium of Saint Cyprien (France) illustrates well this approach.  He created, with a generative computer model of branches, a spectacular atrium covered with steel and concrete branches that diffuses natural light throughout the whole building.  These researches brought him to work on topics of performance and redundancy, an approach particularly remarkable in his project Eiffel DNA (a temporary extension of the third floor of the Eiffel Tower for its 120th anniversary), which initiated a strong controversy.

In 2010, he won the competition for a new Cultural Center of Meudon-la-Forêt (France) in a city originally designed by the French architect Fernand Pouillon. He also won the Auditorium of Amiens, the Bâle/Mulhouse euroairport. In 2011 he won three projects: Maisons des arts urbains d'Épinay-Sous-Sénart, the Museum of the Fromelles Fight and a Job Center in Nantes.

Serero is an adjunct professor at the Ecole d’Architecture Malaquais in Paris, where his research focuses on matters of structural morphology and the performance of building envelopes. He also lectured at New York Pratt Institute and at Columbia University and on architectural design studios and workshops in the USA, in France, Italy and Austria.

His work has been widely published and exhibited in shows in Paris at Pavillon de l’Arsenal, at the Villa Medicis in Rome, at the Museum of Modern Art (MOMA) of New York, at the New York Architectural League, the Venice Biennale, and at the Mori Museum in Tokyo.

SERERO Architects & Urban Planners (SAU) 
In 2000 Serero founded Serero Architects in New York. The firm develops projects combining research and design in the fields of architecture, landscape design and urban planning. With a particular interest in generative design, environmental control, and structural efficiency, Serero Architects attempts to explore new paths for architectural design by weaving connections between these fields and architectural practice.

High level of sustainability is one of the main targets of Serero Architects projects. Processes found in natural environment are a strong source of inspiration of the office to design architectural components such as natural ventilation systems, intelligent building skins and optimized natural light shaft.

Key projects 
2011-2014 : MUSEUM OF THE FROMELLES FIGHT / FRANCE
Competition First Prize Winner
2011-2013 : CULTURAL CENTER IN EPINAY-SOUS-SÉNART / FRANCE
Competition First Prize Winner
2011-2013 : JOB CENTER IN NANTES / FRANCE
Competition First Prize Winner
2010-2013:	MEUDON CULTURAL CENTER, MEUDON/ FRANCE
Competition First Prize Winner
2010-2012:	SAINT-HILAIRE MEDIA CENTER, SAINT-HILAIRE-DU-HARCOUET/FRANCE
Competition First Prize Winner
2009-2012:	AUDITORIUM AND LIBRARY FOR THE UNIVERSITY OFAMIENS, AMIENS/FRANCE
Competition First Prize Winner. Under  construction.
2009-2010:	BUSINESS CENTER EUROAIRPORT, MULHOUSE/FRANCE
Competition First Prize Winner. Under construction
2009-2011:	PLACE DES SAISONS,  TOUR FIRST, LA DEFENSE/FRANCE
Under construction.
2008-2011:	TECHNOPOLE INNOVIA, DOLE/FRANCE
Competition First Prize Winner. Under construction
2007-2010:	ORCINES CULTURAL CENTER, ORCINES /FRANCE
2007-2011:	SAINT CYPRIEN AUDITORIUM AND MOVIE THEATER, SUD ROUSSILLON/FRANCE
Competition First Prize Winner. Not realized.
2006-2009:	ARCHEOLOGICAL MUSEUM OF OISE, VENDEUIL-CAPLY /FRANCE
Competition First Prize Winner. Under construction
2006-2007:	EXHIBITION  DESIGN OF THE  « DIASPORA D’AFRIQUE » AND « ARTS DU BÉNIN », PARIS/FRANCE
BUILT
2005:	ARCADE GROUPE HEADQUARTERS, PARIS/FRANCE
BUILT.
2004-2005:	VARIABILITY GEOMETRY ACOUSTICAL DOMES, Villa Médicis, ROME/ ITALY
BUILT.
2004-2012:	HELLENIKON METROPOLITAN PARK, ATHENS, GREECE
Competition Prize Winner. Under construction
2004-2005:	NEW YORK CENTER FOR THE ART STUDIES, NYCAMS, NEW YORK/USA
BUILT.
2004-2005:	GLASS LOFT, NEW YORK /USA
BUILT.
2004: 	PS1/MOMA URBAN BEACH COMPETITION, NEW YORK/USA
FINALIST
2003-2008:	ART ARENA, ART MOVIE MUSEUM,
Competition Prize Winner. Under realization

References

External links  
 archdaily.com
 archi-europe.com
 bustler.net
 archtracker.com
 architecturenewsplus.com
  archiportale.com
 designboom.com

20th-century French architects
21st-century French architects
Living people
1974 births
People from Grenoble
Columbia Graduate School of Architecture, Planning and Preservation alumni
French people of Moroccan-Jewish descent